J. G. Niederegger GmbH & Co. KG is a producer of marzipan and sweets which is based in Lübeck, Germany.

Niederegger was founded in Lübeck on 1 March 1806 by Johann Georg Niederegger (1777–1856).  The company is a family-owned limited private partnership.

Niederegger marzipan made by "canditors" since the days of the Hanseatic League is classed as 100% marzipan.  By the 19th century, marzipan, traditionally the choice of kings and queens, was becoming popular with the ordinary people of Lübeck. The tradition that Niederegger marzipan contains much less sugar than that produced by other marzipan makers began with Johann Georg, who was apprentice to Maret, another confectioner. Johann Georg left in 1806 to set up his own shop, and the products he produced were of such high quality that they were sought out by kings and emperors.

In the town center of Lübeck, opposite the Town Hall, the always-crowded Café Niederegger, known as the "harem confectionery", offers a café, a shop for Niederegger sweets, and a marzipan museum on its upper floors.  It is possible to trace the sale of the almond product on the premises back to the 12th century.  

Niederegger's many customers have included the writer, and son of Lübeck, Thomas Mann.

References

External links
 Official site
 History

Food and drink companies of Germany
Brand name confectionery
Lübeck
Food and drink companies established in 1806
Marzipan